Borrowston, with a population of about 50, is a crofting township situated on the Isle of Lewis, on the Outer Hebrides of Scotland. Borrowston is within the parish of Uig, and is situated near to the A858, which runs through Carloway. The hill Ben Borriston lies to the west.

References

External links

Canmore - Lewis, Borrowston site record
Canmore - Lewis, Carloway, Pier and Storehouses site record
Canmore - Lewis, Borrowston site record

Villages in the Isle of Lewis